The Royal and Pontifical Higher University of San Francisco Xavier of Chuquisaca (USFX) is a public university in Sucre, Bolivia. It is one of the oldest universities of the new world, ranking as the second oldest university in the Americas behind Peru's National University of San Marcos. On many historical texts it is also referred as the University of Charcas.

Founded in 1624 by order of the Spanish King Philip IV, and with the support of Pope Innocent XII, the university was intended to provide an education in Law and Theology to the families and descendants of the wealthy gentry of South America.

At the turn of the 19th century, Chuquisaca and its university came to constitute a center of revolutionary zeal in Bolivia. The university intellectually sustained the well-cultivated Francophile elite whose ideals led to the Bolivian War of Independence and ultimately to the independence of all the Spanish colonies. Once a Republic was proclaimed by Simón Bolívar, the university became the main university of the new country.

Until the first decades of the 20th century, its law faculty remained famous all across South America.

See also
 List of universities in Bolivia
 List of colonial universities in Latin America
 List of Jesuit sites

External links
 Fundacion de la Universidad San Francisco Xavier de Chuquisaca 

Universities in Bolivia
Sucre
Colonial Bolivia
1624 establishments in the Spanish Empire
Educational institutions established in the 1620s
1620s in Peru
17th century in the Viceroyalty of Peru
Andean Baroque architecture